Sindelfingen (Swabian: Sendlfenga) is a city in Baden-Württemberg in south Germany. It lies near Stuttgart at the headwaters of the Schwippe (a tributary of the river Würm), and is home to a Mercedes-Benz assembly plant.

History
 1155 – First documented mention of Sindelfingen
 1263 – Sindelfingen was founded by Count Rudolf Scherer of Tübingen-Herrenberg
 1351 – The city was sold to Württemberg
 Middle Ages – Notable weaving industry
 1535 – Entrance of the Protestant Reformation
 1944 – Stuttgart/Sindelfingen oil refinery bombed by the Oil Campaign of World War II
 1962 – Sindelfingen became a "Große Kreisstadt" (city with special governmental responsibilities within the larger county)
 1971 – Municipal annexation of the neighbouring villages Maichingen and Darmsheim
 1987 – The final traditional Sindelfinger Volksfest was held (the site was later required for a state-level horticulture and landscaping exhibition)

The weaving industry survived until most of Europe's textile industry was devastated by Asian imports. Some textile distribution centres are still left in the city. Former weaving mills can still be found in the city area, now used as offices for the computer industry. This is due to the takeover of Hollerith by IBM which used the punched card technology from the weaving mills.

Geography
Neighbouring towns and cities: Böblingen (contiguous), Stuttgart (15 km), Leonberg. The highest point is 531 meters above sea level and to the north is the Glemswald (nature reserve).

Points of interest

 Old city hall, now a city museum
 St. Martin (consecrated 1083)
 A short alley with half timbered houses (Fachwerkhäusern)
 Old cemetery (behind the city library)
 Witch's Leap
 Kloster Pond
 Large public swimming pool with a long water slide
 Water tower on Goldberg
 Water tower Sindelfingen-Steige
 Water tower Sindelfingen-Eichholz
 Friendship Fountain on the market place, designed by Bonifatius Stirnberg. Around a central fountain with the Pegasus are six small fountains representing the six partner towns of Sindelfingen. The figures can rotate.
 Miniature Railway in the Sommerhofen Park
 Powerline-branch Maichingen
 Zweigart-Sawitzki-Bridge
 High-based pylons
 TV repeater Darmsheim
 Transmitter Tower Fuchsberg
 Transmitter Tower service area Forest of Sindelfingen
 Daimler AG factory. Tours can be arranged through Mercedes dealers.
 Haus zur Geschichte der IBM Datenverarbeitung (IBM Dataprocessing History Museum)

Culture
Sindelfingen has an annual International Street Fair which features ethnic food and performances from the partner cities, as well as from various local ethnic clubs.

Demography
The resident counts below are either estimates, based upon census (*) or official records of respective statistical offices. All figures after 1871 are taken from the statistical office of Baden-Württemberg.

Mercedes-Benz factory

The factory was founded in 1915 by Daimler Motoren Gesellschaft to produce aircraft engines, hence why the plant initially had a runway located onsite. Post-World War I the first passenger car was manufactured, following the merger with Benz & Cie. founded by Karl Benz. In 1926, the entire body shop of the new Daimler-Benz group was relocated to the Sindelfingen plant, allowing plant manager Wilhelm Friedle to introduce assembly line production the following year, and in 1929 the first press shop was opened. By 1938 the plant employed about 6,500 people, and in the lead-in to World War II most production was aligned to military contracts, mainly trucks such as the LC 3000; passenger car production ceased by 1942. Initially replacing male workers with local women, Mercedes then took forced labour, including prisoners of war. Western European prisoners were initially housed in near-by boarding houses, but with the start of the Eastern front the local Nazi administration formed the co-located Riedmühle concentration camp, which from 1942 loaned workers to the company in return for payment to the Nazi Government in Berlin. By 1944, almost half of Daimler Benz's 63,610 Daimler Benz employees were civilian forced labourers. Post-WW2, Daimler-Benz admitted its links with the Nazi regime, and became involved in the German Industry Foundation's initiative "Remembrance, Responsibility and Future".

With heavy Allied bombing, the town and plant were not suitably reconstructed until late 1946, with resumed production of the Mercedes-Benz W136. Two-shift production was introduced from 1950, with the relocation of final car assembly to the plant, meaning that by 1955 80,500 cars were manufactured. The Mercedes-Benz W116 was first produced in 1972, the first model of the Mercedes-Benz S-Class, which the plant still produces today as the current model Mercedes-Benz W223. Until 2015, the plant was the top-producing Daimler AG plant, when with 319,000 vehicles manufactured it was overtaken by the Bremen plant with 324,000.

Today, covering 2,955,944 m2 with a production area 1,305,557 m2, the 37,000 people employed (April 2016 – around 10,000 are research and development), the plant still produces over 300,000 vehicles per year, around 15% of total Daimler Group vehicle production. Second in production scale to Bremen in the Daimler Group, it is the third largest vehicle manufacturing plant in Germany, behind Volkswagen's Wolfsburg plant and the Audi plant at Ingolstadt.

Transport
Sindelfingen can be reached through the A8 and A81 motorways, and through the S-Bahn connections to Stuttgart or Herrenberg. The nearest airport is the Stuttgart Airport.

Twin towns – sister cities

Sindelfingen is twinned with:

 Schaffhausen, Switzerland (1952)
 Corbeil-Essonnes, France (1961)
 Sondrio, Italy (1962)
 Dronfield, England, United Kingdom (1981)
 Torgau, Germany (1988)
 Győr, Hungary (1989)
 Chełm, Poland (2001)

Sindelfingen also cooperates with the Eurotowns network.

Notable people
 Carl Eytel (1862–1925), German-American artist
 Roland Emmerich, (born 1955), film producer, director and author, grew up here
 Monika (born 1968), Christoph (born 1969) & Markus (born 1969) Henschel, sibling musicians
 Cubeatz (born 1991), hip-hop production duo

References

External links

Böblingen (district)
Oil campaign of World War II
Towns in Baden-Württemberg
Württemberg